In mathematics, equality is a relationship between two quantities or, more generally two mathematical expressions, asserting that the quantities have the same value, or that the expressions represent the same mathematical object. The symbol "" is called an "equals sign". Two objects that are not equal are said to be distinct.

For example:
  means that  and  denote the same object.
 The identity  means that if  is any number, then the two expressions have the same value. This may also be interpreted as saying that the two sides of the equals sign represent the same function.
  if and only if  This assertion, which uses set-builder notation, means that if the elements satisfying the property  are the same as the elements satisfying  then the two uses of the set-builder notation define the same set. This property is often expressed as "two sets that have the same elements are equal." It is one of the usual axioms of set theory, called axiom of extensionality.

Etymology
The etymology of the word is from the Latin aequālis (“equal”, “like”, “comparable”, “similar”) from aequus (“equal”, “level”, “fair”, “just”).

Basic properties

These last three properties make equality an equivalence relation. They were originally included among the Peano axioms for natural numbers. Although the symmetric and transitive properties are often seen as fundamental, they can be deduced from substitution and reflexive properties.

Equality as predicate 
When A and B are not fully specified or depend on some variables, equality is a proposition, which may be true for some values and false for other values. Equality is a binary relation (i.e., a two-argument predicate) which may produce a truth value (false or true) from its arguments. In computer programming, its computation from the two expressions is known as comparison.

Identities

When A and B may be viewed as functions of some variables, then A = B means that A and B define the same function. Such an equality of functions is sometimes called an identity. An example is  Sometimes, but not always, an identity is written with a triple bar:

Equations
An equation is a problem of finding values of some variables, called , for which the specified equality is true. The term "equation" may also refer to an equality relation that is satisfied only for the values of the variables that one is interested in.

There is no standard notation that distinguishes an equation from an identity, or other use of the equality relation: one has to guess an appropriate interpretation from the semantics of expressions and the context. An "equation" may sometimes mean an identity, but more often than not, it  a subset of the variable space to be the subset where the equation is true.

Approximate equality 
There are some logic systems that do not have any notion of equality. This reflects the undecidability of the equality of two real numbers, defined by formulas involving the integers, the basic arithmetic operations, the logarithm and the exponential function. In other words, there cannot exist any algorithm for deciding such an equality.

The binary relation "is approximately equal" (denoted by the symbol ) between real numbers or other things, even if more precisely defined, is not transitive (since many small differences can add up to something big). However, equality almost everywhere is transitive.

A questionable equality under test may be denoted using the ≟ symbol.

Relation with equivalence, congruence, and isomorphism 

Viewed as a relation, equality is the archetype of the more general concept of an equivalence relation on a set: those binary relations that are reflexive, symmetric and transitive. The identity relation is an equivalence relation. Conversely, let R be an equivalence relation, and let us denote by xR the equivalence class of x, consisting of all elements z such that x R z. Then the relation x R y is equivalent with the equality xR = yR. It follows that equality is the finest equivalence relation on any set S in the sense that it is the relation that has the smallest equivalence classes (every class is reduced to a single element).

In some contexts, equality is sharply distinguished from equivalence or isomorphism. This distinction gives rise to the notion of a quotient set.

Similarly, the sets
 and 

are not equal sets — the first consists of letters, while the second consists of numbers — but they are both sets of three elements and thus isomorphic, meaning that there is a bijection between them. For example

However, there are other choices of isomorphism, such as

and these sets cannot be identified without making such a choice — any statement that identifies them "depends on choice of identification". This distinction, between equality and isomorphism, is of fundamental importance in category theory and is one motivation for the development of category theory.

In some cases, one may consider as equal two mathematical objects that are only equivalent for the properties and structure being considered. The word congruence (and the associated symbol ) is frequently used for this kind of equality, and is defined as the quotient set of the isomorphism classes between the objects. In geometry for instance, two geometric shapes are said to be equal or congruent when one may be moved to coincide with the other, and the equality/congruence relation is the isomorphism classes of isometries between shapes. Similarly to isomorphisms of sets, the difference between isomorphisms and equality/congruence between such mathematical objects with properties and structure was one motivation for the development of category theory, as well as for homotopy type theory and univalent foundations.

Logical definitions 

Leibniz characterized the notion of equality as follows:
 Given any x and y, x = y if and only if, given any predicate P, P(x) if and only if P(y).

Equality in set theory 

Equality of sets is axiomatized in set theory in two different ways, depending on whether the axioms are based on a first-order language with or without equality.

Set equality based on first-order logic with equality 
In first-order logic with equality, the axiom of extensionality states that two sets which contain the same elements are the same set.

 Logic axiom: x = y ⇒ ∀z, (z ∈ x ⇔ z ∈ y)
 Logic axiom: x = y ⇒ ∀z, (x ∈ z ⇔ y ∈ z)
 Set theory axiom: (∀z, (z ∈ x ⇔ z ∈ y)) ⇒ x = y

Incorporating half of the work into the first-order logic may be regarded as a mere matter of convenience, as noted by Lévy.
 "The reason why we take up first-order predicate calculus with equality is a matter of convenience; by this we save the labor of defining equality and proving all its properties; this burden is now assumed by the logic."

Set equality based on first-order logic without equality 
In first-order logic without equality, two sets are defined to be equal if they contain the same elements. Then the axiom of extensionality states that two equal sets are contained in the same sets.

 Set theory definition: "x = y" means ∀z, (z ∈ x ⇔ z ∈ y)
 Set theory axiom: x = y ⇒ ∀z, (x ∈ z ⇔ y ∈ z)

See also
Extensionality
Homotopy type theory
Inequality
List of mathematical symbols
Logical equality
Proportionality (mathematics)

Notes

References

External links
 

Mathematical logic
Binary relations
Elementary arithmetic
Equivalence (mathematics)